was a town located in Kaho District, Fukuoka Prefecture, Japan.

, the town had an estimated population of 11,009 and a density of 147.16 persons per km². The total area was 74.81 km².

On March 26, 2006, Chikuho, along with the towns of Honami, Kaita and Shōnai (all from Kaho District), was merged into the expanded city of Iizuka.

Primary and secondary schools

The city formerly had a North Korean school, Chikuho Korean Elementary School (筑豊朝鮮初級学校).

References

External links
 Iizuka official website 
 Chikuho official website  (Archive)

Dissolved municipalities of Fukuoka Prefecture
Populated places disestablished in 2006
2006 disestablishments in Japan